Edward Swain Davis (June 22, 1808 – August 7, 1887) was a Massachusetts politician who served as the eighth Mayor of Lynn, Massachusetts.

Notes

1808 births
1887 deaths
Mayors of Lynn, Massachusetts
Massachusetts city council members
Members of the Massachusetts House of Representatives
19th-century American politicians